The 2012 St Helens season saw the club compete in Super League XV as well as the 2012 Challenge Cup tournament.

This year Typhoo became St Helens major jersey sponsor.

Pre-season friendlies

Super League

References

Super League XVII by club
St Helens R.F.C. seasons